Pánd is a village in Pest county, Hungary.

Location
It is almost entirely located in the valleys of Őr Hill and Dobos Hill. A smaller stream crosses the southern part of the settlement that empties into the river Tápió which is part of the Danube's drainage basin.

References

Populated places in Pest County